Team Goh Motorsports is a Japanese auto racing team founded by Kazumichi Goh in 1996. They currently compete in the Japanese Super Formula Championship.

History 
Initially competing in the All-Japan Grand Touring Car Championship (JGTC), Team Goh won the 1996 championship with a McLaren F1 GTR and drivers John Nielsen and David Brabham.

24 Hours of Le Mans 

In 2001, Team Goh partnered with the Danish Den Blå Avis team, running a Dome-Judd in the FIA Sportscar Championship, earning two wins and finishing second in the championship. The following year, Kazumichi Goh purchased an Audi R8, as part of a three-year program at Le Mans. Goh also participated in the 1000 km of Spa and 1000 km of Le Mans, winning both events with drivers Seiji Ara and Tom Kristensen.

In 2004, Goh entered the new Le Mans Endurance Series with their R8, finishing the season third in the championship.  At the 24 Hours of Le Mans, Goh drivers Ara and Kristensen were joined by Rinaldo Capello, and won the race overall, becoming only the second Japanese team to take the overall victory.

The team then focused on a return to the JGTC, which had by then been renamed to Super GT, acquiring a new GT1-spec Maserati MC12 with the aim of entering the 2006 season.  However, the GT1-spec car was well off the pace of its Japanese GT500-class competitors during pre-season testing, causing the team to withdraw from the championship.

Three years later, the team would return to competition, entering a Porsche RS Spyder in the 2009 24 Hours of Le Mans. It was running second in class when driver Seiji Ara suffered a large accident on the Mulsanne Straight, forcing the car's retirement. It would turn out to be the team's only outing with the Porsche, as the car was sold in August 2009, only two months after the race. Moreover, the race turned out to be Goh's only outing in what was planned to be a multi-year programme, as the collapse of the team's title sponsor in February 2010 forced the suspension of all activity.

2019 
In 2019, after a hiatus of nearly nine years, Kazumichi Goh announced the return of Team Goh, along with a new partnership with McLaren. Competing as McLaren Customer Racing Japan, Team Goh planned to field a McLaren 720S GT3 in Super GT's GT300 class, alongside an additional 720S in the 2019 Suzuka 10 Hours. The team had originally planned to enter its second car in the Super Taikyu series, but was forced to abandon its plans prior to the season opener, citing a lack of parts. The team later withdrew from the Suzuka 10 Hours as well, citing a Balance of Performance that Goh felt was unfavorable to the team's McLarens. Goh's Super GT entry did go ahead, the team contesting all rounds of the season save for the flyaway Buriram round. After a disappointing season in which the team finished 14th in the teams' standings despite taking a podium at Autopolis and pole at Motegi, the team withdrew from Super GT at the end of 2019.

2020 
On December 19, 2019, Dale Coyne Racing announced they have formed a partnership with Team Goh for the 2020 IndyCar Series. The team will be known as Dale Coyne Racing with Team Goh with its ex-Super GT driver Alex Palou driving the team's No. 55 entry. Palou finished third in just his third career start at Road America. He would finish the season 16th in the drivers' standings, before Palou and Team Goh departed Dale Coyne Racing ahead of the 2021 IndyCar season.

In 2020, Team Goh announced a partnership with BMW Team Studie in Super GT, with McLaren Customer Racing Japan now operating as Customer Racing Support Limited (CSL). Kazumichi Goh was named the General Manager of BMW Team Studie x CSL's GT300 entry, and Seiji Ara was named one of the team's drivers, alongside gentleman racer Tomohide Yamaguchi. Goh's involvement with BMW Team Studie continued for the 2021 and 2022 seasons.

2021 
In 2021, Team Goh partnered with Team Mugen to form Red Bull Mugen Team Goh, who entered the number 15 Red Bull Dallara SF19/Honda for Hiroki Otsu in the Super Formula Championship. Otsu finished the season sixth in the drivers' championship and won Rookie of the Year honours, while Mugen/Team Goh finished seventh in the teams' championship with their single car entry.

2022 
For their second season in Super Formula, Team Goh will run as an independent, two-car team with Honda engines. On 18 January 2022, it was announced that Kazuhiro Ikeda, the president of Servus Japan, will succeed Kazumichi Goh as the team principal and representative director of the company,  Ren Sato and Atsushi Miyake were announced as the drivers for the 2022 season. On 26 February 2022, it was announced that former Honda Formula One project manager, Masashi Yamamoto, will be the team manager.

Racing results

IndyCar Series
(key)

* Season still in progress

References

External links
 

Japanese auto racing teams
Auto racing teams established in 1996
1996 establishments in Japan
24 Hours of Le Mans teams
FIA GT Championship teams
European Le Mans Series teams
Super GT teams
Super Formula teams
FIA Sportscar Championship entrants
Honda in motorsport
IndyCar Series teams